was a village located in Shūfu District later Shūsō District, Ehime Prefecture.

Timeline
 December 15, 1889 - Due to the municipal status enforcement, the villages of 長野, 田野村上方, 北田野, 高松, and 川根, Shūfu District, merged to form as the village of Tano, Shūfu District.
 April 1, 1897 - Due to Shūfu District merged with Kuwamura District, the village becomes the village of Tano, Shūsō District.
 September 1, 1956 - Merged with the town of Tanbara and parts of the village of Nakagawa to become the town of Tanbara.
 November 1, 2004 - The town of Tanbara merged with the cities of Saijō and Tōyo and the town of Komatsu to become the city of Saijō.

Dissolved municipalities of Ehime Prefecture